Associazione Sportiva Dilettantistica Ginnastica e Calcio Sora is an Italian association football club, based in Sora, Lazio.

History
It was founded in 1907. It has participated at the national championships several times in Serie C from the season 1933–1934 and the then in Prima Divisione 1933–1934. The last period of prolonged stay in Serie C lasted 13 years, has started the season in Serie C2 1992–93 and continued until the 2004–05 season in Serie C1.

After the company failed in 2005, a phoenix club was militating in Eccellenza Lazio.

In the 2010–11 season, by beating the Lupa Frascati, in the tie-breaker for first place of group B Eccellenza Lazio, on 22 May 2011 at the Stadio Flaminio, it guarantees the participation in the 2011–12 season in Serie D.

In the summer of 2015, Sora had a large financial deficit and will not participate in the Serie D next season, ultimately folding.

It refounded in 2016, entering Prima Categoria, gaining promotion to Promozione the following season.

Colors and badge
Its colours are black and white.

Stadium
The club plays its home matches at Stadio Claudio Tomei in Sora.

Honours

Campionato Interregionale
1991–92 (Group E)
Eccellenza
2010–11 (Group B)
Promozione
1952–53 (Group B), 1977–78 (Group B), 1988–89 (Group C)
Prima Categoria
1967–68 (Group B), 1987–88, 2006–07, 2016–17 (Group H)
Seconda Divisione
1932–33

References

External links
 Official homepage

Football clubs in Lazio
Sora ASD
Association football clubs established in 1907
1907 establishments in Italy
Association football clubs disestablished in 2015
2015 disestablishments in Italy
Defunct football clubs in Italy
2016 establishments in Italy
Association football clubs established in 2016